"Oh Yeah" is a single released in 1985 by the band Yello and featured on their album Stella. The song features a mix of electronic music and manipulated vocals. The song gained popularity after being featured in the films Ferris Bueller's Day Off and The Secret of My Success, among other films. It is a popular staple in pop culture.

Production

Describing the composition of "Oh Yeah," Boris Blank said:

Personnel 
Yello

 Dieter Meier – lead and background vocals
 Boris Blank – keyboards, programming, background vocals

Additional personnel

 Petia Kaufman – glass harp†

Charts

The song (and others) has been aggressively shopped around, the group going so far as to produce a special "All Time Classics" CD for advertising, television and movies.

The song has been wildly successful, and was the basis for Dieter Meier's investment fortune, which as of 2017 was valued at an estimated $175 million.

Remix
A remix of the song, entitled, "Oh Yeah Oh Six" went to No. 1 on the US dance charts in 2006.

Legacy

After its use in the 1986 film Ferris Bueller's Day Off  an "incredibly infectious song" from which it became virtually known as 'the Ferris Bueller song'  the song was used in various other film soundtracks through the end of the decade and developed a reputation as a 1980s Hollywood cliche. It was prominently used in the 1987 film The Secret of My Success. It was also part of the soundtrack in She's Out of Control and Opportunity Knocks. The song was used in a series of Twix commercials from 1988 to 1990. It was also used in the 1989 film K-9.

Film critic Jonathan Bernstein observed that despite never reaching hit status, the song "has become synonymous with avarice and lust. Every time a movie, TV show or commercial wants to underline the jaw-dropping impact of a hot babe or sleek auto, that synth-drum starts popping and that deep voice rumbles, 'Oh yeah…". A 2014 article on The Dissolve website, suggests the song is used to metaphorically represent lust (in various forms) and cocaine.

The song became a conceit on The Simpsons, being used when Duffman appears; an idiomatic staple in video games; and a repeated choice in television advertisements.

Matthew Broderick reprised his Bueller role in a Honda commercial aired during the Super Bowl XLVI, in which "Oh Yeah" was featured. A teaser for the ad had appeared two weeks prior to the Super Bowl, which had created rumors of a possible film sequel. It was produced by Santa Monica-based RPA and directed by Todd Phillips. Adweek's Tim Nudd called the ad "a great homage to the original 1986 film, with Broderick this time calling in sick to a film shoot and enjoying another day of slacking." On the other hand, Jalopnik'''s Matt Hardigree called the spot "sacrilegious".

The song appears in the video game Gran Turismo 4, both as one of the songs of the racing BGM and the music played when the player fails a License Test.

The song also appears in the live-action/computer animated musical comedy film Alvin and the Chipmunks: The Squeakquel in the scene of Toby's horrible school memory (at the time Toby was played by Zachary Levi). 

The song features prominently in an episode of the comedy series It's Always Sunny in Philadelphia, "Sweet Dee Has a Heart Attack". Characters refer to it as "that song from the 80s, 'Day Bow Bow and reference its use in The Secret of My Success. Later in the same episode, the actual song plays when Charlie Kelly talks about himself receiving mail from an imaginary man named Pepe Silvia, which later became an internet meme.

The song was used during a sketch on the TV show Saturday Night Live, with celebrity guest Margot Robbie.

The song was used in a Domino's Pizza commercial in 2017 that homages Ferris Bueller's Day Off;

The song was used in the 2017 films Captain Underpants: The First Epic Movie and Spider-Man: Homecoming, the latter using footage from Ferris Bueller's Day Off.

Jerry Smith does karaoke to the song in the Rick and Morty episode "Amortycan Grickfitti" while his kids joyride in his father-in-law Rick's spaceship.

The song was used in season 3, episode 1 of Sex Education''.

It also forms the soundtrack to a one-minute McDonalds advert in 2023 directed by Edgar Wright.

References

Notes

Citations

Bibliography
 

1985 songs
1985 singles
1987 singles
Yello songs
Elektra Records singles
Novelty songs
Songs written by Boris Blank (musician)
Songs written by Dieter Meier
Film and television memes